Dóra Stefánsdóttir (born 27 April 1985) is a retired Icelandic footballer who last played for Swedish club LdB FC Malmö. Dóra was part of Iceland's national team and competed in UEFA Women's Euro 2009. She retired in 2010 due to a knee injury.

She has captained the national youth teams, U-17, U-19 and U-21.

Achievements 
Icelandic champion with Valur in 2004.
Icelandic cup winner with Valur in 2001 and 2003.

References

External links

1985 births
Living people
Dora Stefansdottir
Dora Stefansdottir
Expatriate footballers in Sweden
Damallsvenskan players
FC Rosengård players
Women's association football midfielders
Dora Stefansdottir